In the 19th century France built a new French colonial empire second only to the British Empire. It was humiliated in the Franco-Prussian War of 1870–71, which marked the rise of Germany to dominance in Europe. France allied with Great Britain and Russia and was on the winning side of the First World War. If it was initially easily defeated early in the Second World War, Free France, through its Free French Forces and the Resistance, continued to fight against the Axis powers as an Allied nation and was ultimately considered one of the victors of the war, as the allocation of a French occupation zone in Germany and West Berlin testifies, as well as the status of permanent member of the United Nations Security Council. It fought losing colonial wars in Indochina (ending in 1954) and Algeria (ending in 1962).  The Fourth Republic collapsed and the Fifth Republic began in 1958 to the present. Under Charles De Gaulle it tried to block American and British influence on the European community. Since 1945, France has been a founding member of the United Nations, of NATO, and of the European Coal and Steel Community (the European Union's predecessor). As a charter member of the United Nations, France holds one of the permanent seats in the Security Council and is a member of most of its specialized and related agencies.

France is also a founding member of the Union for the Mediterranean and the La Francophonie and plays a key role, both in regional and in international affairs.

Fifth Republic since 1981

François Mitterrand: 1981–1995

François Mitterrand, a Socialist, emphasized European unity and the preservation of France's special relationships with its former colonies in the face of "Anglo-Saxon influence." A part of the enacted policies was formulated in the Socialist Party's 110 Propositions for France, the electoral program for the 1981 presidential election.  He had a warm and effective relationship with the conservative German Chancellor Helmut Kohl. They promoted French-German bilateralism in Europe and strengthened military cooperation between the two countries.

According to Wayne Northcutt, certain domestic circumstances helped shape Mitterrand's foreign policy in four ways: he needed to maintain a political consensus; he kept an eye on economic conditions; he believed in the nationalistic imperative for French policy; and he tried to exploit Gaullism and its heritage that is on political advantage.

Jacques Chirac

Chrirac's foreign policy featured continuity.  His most dramatic move was a break with Washington. Along with his friend Vladimir Putin of Russia, Hu Jintao of China, and Gerhard Schröder of Germany, Chirac emerged as a leading voice against the Iraq War of 2003. They opposed George W. Bush of the U.S. and Tony Blair of Britain during the organisation and deployment of a "Coalition of the willing" to forcibly remove the government of Iraq controlled by the Ba'ath Party under the dictatorship of Saddam Hussein. Despite British and American pressure, Chirac threatened to veto a resolution in the UN Security Council that would authorise the use of military force to rid Iraq of alleged weapons of mass destruction. He rallied other governments to his position. "Iraq today does not represent an immediate threat that justifies an immediate war", Chirac said on 18 March 2003. Future Prime Minister Dominique de Villepin acquired much of his popularity for his speech against the war at the United Nations (UN).

Nicolas Sarkozy

Shortly after taking office, President Sarkozy began negotiations with Colombian president Álvaro Uribe and the left-wing guerrilla FARC, regarding the release of hostages held by the rebel group, especially Franco-Colombian politician Ingrid Betancourt. According to some sources, Sarkozy himself asked for Uribe to release FARC's "chancellor" Rodrigo Granda.
 Furthermore, he announced on 24 July 2007, that French and European representatives had obtained the extradition of the Bulgarian nurses detained in Libya to their country. In exchange, he signed with Gaddafi security, health care and immigration pacts – and a $230 million (168 million euros) MILAN antitank missile sale. The contract was the first made by Libya since 2004, and was negotiated with MBDA, a subsidiary of EADS. Another 128 million euros contract would have been signed, according to Tripoli, with EADS for a TETRA radio system. The Socialist Party (PS) and the Communist Party (PCF) criticized a "state affair" and a "barter" with a "Rogue state". The leader of the PS, François Hollande, requested the opening of a parliamentary investigation.

On 8 June 2007, during the 33rd G8 summit in Heiligendamm, Sarkozy set a goal of reducing French CO2 emissions by 50% by 2050 in order to prevent global warming. He then pushed forward the important Socialist figure of Dominique Strauss-Kahn as European nominee to the International Monetary Fund (IMF). Critics alleged that Sarkozy proposed to nominate Strauss-Kahn as managing director of the IMF to deprive the Socialist Party of one of its more popular figures.

Sarkozy normalised what had been strained relations with NATO.  In 2009, France again was a fully integrated NATO member. François Hollande has continued the same policy.

François Hollande

Socialist François Hollande won election in 2012 as president. He adopted a generally hawkish foreign-policy, in close collaboration with Germany in regard to opposing Russian moves against Ukraine, and in sending the military to fight radical Islamists in Africa. He takes a hard line with regard to the Greek debt crisis. François Hollande launched two military operations in Africa: Operation Serval in Mali (the French armed forces stopped an Islamist takeover of Bamako, the nation's capital city); and Operation Sangaris (to restore peace there as tensions between different religious communities had turned into a violent conflict). France was also the first European nation to join the United States in bombing the Islamic State of Iraq and the Levant. Under President Hollande, France's stances on the civil war in Syria and Iran's nuclear program has been described as "hawkish".

Emmanuel Macron, 2017–present

Sophie Meunier in 2017 ponders whether France is still relevant in world affairs:
France does not have as much relative global clout as it used to. Decolonization ... diminished France’s territorial holdings and therefore its influence. Other countries acquired nuclear weapons and built up their armies. The message of “universal” values carried by French foreign policy has encountered much resistance, as other countries have developed following a different political trajectory than the one preached by France. By the 1990s, the country had become, in the words of Stanley Hoffmann, an “ordinary power, neither a basket case nor a challenger.” Public opinion, especially in the United States, no longer sees France as an essential power. The last time that its foreign policy put France back in the world spotlight was at the outset of the Iraq intervention...[with] France’s refusal to join the US-led coalition....In reality, however, France is still a highly relevant power in world affairs....France is a country of major military importance nowadays...., France also showed it mattered in world environmental affairs with....the Paris Agreement, a global accord to reduce carbon emissions. The election of Trump in 2016 may reinforce demands for France to step in and lead global environmental governance if the US disengages, as the new president has promised, from a variety of policies.

In July 2019, the UN ambassadors from 22 nations, including France, signed a joint letter to the UNHRC condemning China’s mistreatment of the Uyghurs as well as its mistreatment of other minority groups, urging the Chinese government to close the Xinjiang re-education camps.

On 31 May 2022, due to the reforms pushed by the president and perceived lack of recognition, the French diplomats will go on a strike for the first time in 20 years. This is a bad timing for President Emmanuel Macron as the France is holding the EU Presidency until the end of June.

International organization participation
ACCT, AfDB, AsDB, Australia Group, BDEAC, BIS, CCC, CDB (non-regional), CE, CERN, EAPC, EBRD, ECA (associate), ECE, ECLAC, EIB, EMU, ESA, ESCAP, EU, FAO, FZ, G-5, G-7, G-10, IADB, IAEA, IBRD, ICAO, ICC, ICC, ICRM, IDA, IEA, IFAD, IFC, IFRCS, IHO, ILO, IMF, International Maritime Organization, Inmarsat, InOC, Intelsat, Interpol, IOC, IOM, ISO, ITU, ITUC, MINURSO, MIPONUH, MONUC, NAM (guest), NATO, NEA, NSG, OAS (observer), OECD, OPCW, OSCE, PCA, SPC, UN, UN Security Council, UNCTAD, UNESCO, UNHCR, UNIDO, UNIFIL, UNIKOM, UNITAR, UNMIBH, UNMIK, UNOMIG, UNRWA, UNTSO, UNU, UPU, WADB (nonregional), WEU, WFTU, WHO, WIPO, WMO, WToO, WTrO, Zangger Committee

International border disputes
Madagascar claims Bassas da India, Europa Island, Glorioso Islands and Juan de Nova Island
Comoros claims Mayotte
Mauritius claims Tromelin Island
territorial dispute on the boundary between Suriname and French Guiana
territorial claim in Antarctica (Adelie Land) under the Antarctic Treaty System
Matthew and Hunter Islands east of New Caledonia claimed by France and Vanuatu

Middle East

France established relations with the Middle East during the reign of Louis XIV. To keep Austria from intervening into its plans regarding Western Europe he lent limited support to the Ottoman Empire, though the victories of Prince Eugene of Savoy destroyed these plans. In the nineteenth century France together with Great Britain tried to strengthen the Ottoman Empire, the now "Sick man of Europe", to resist Russian expansion, culminating in the Crimean War.

France also pursued close relations with the semi-autonomous Egypt. In 1869 Egyptian workers -under the supervision of France- completed the Suez Canal. A rivalry emerged between France and Britain for control of Egypt, and eventually Britain emerged victorious by buying out the Egyptian shares of the company before the French had time to act.

After the unification of Germany in 1871, Germany successfully attempted to co-opt France's relations with the Ottomans. In World War I the Ottoman Empire joined the Central Powers, and was defeated by France and Britain. After the collapse of the Ottoman Empire France and Britain divided the Middle East between themselves. France received Syria and Lebanon.

1945–1958

These colonies were granted independence after 1945, but France still tried to forge cultural and educational bonds between the areas, particularly with Lebanon. Relationships with Syria are more strained, due to the policies of that country. In 2005, France, along with the United States, pressured Syria to evacuate Lebanon.
In the post-World War II era French relations with the Arab Middle East reached a very low point. The war in Algeria between Muslim fighters and French colonists deeply concerned the rest of the Muslim world. The Algerian fighters received much of their supplies and funding from Egypt and other Arab powers, much to France's displeasure.

Most damaging to Franco-Arab relations, however, was the Suez Crisis. It greatly diminished France's reputation in the region. France openly supported the Israeli attack on the Sinai peninsula, and was working against Nasser, then a popular figure in the Middle East. The Suez Crisis also made France and the United Kingdom look again like imperialist powers attempting to impose their will upon weaker nations. Another hindrance to France's relations with the Arab Middle East was its close alliance with Israel during the 1950s.

De Gaulle's policies
This all changed with the coming of Charles de Gaulle to power. De Gaulle's foreign policy was centered around an attempt to limit the power and influence of both superpowers, and at the same time increase France's international prestige.  De Gaulle hoped to move France from being a follower of the United States to becoming the leading nation of a large group of non-aligned countries. The nations de Gaulle looked at as potential participants in this group were those in France's traditional spheres of influence: Africa and the Middle East. The former French colonies in eastern and northern Africa were quite agreeable to these close relations with France.  These nations had close economic and cultural ties to France, and they also had few other suitors amongst the major powers. This new orientation of French foreign policy also appealed strongly to the leaders of the Arab nations. None of them wanted to be dominated by either of the superpowers, and they supported France's policy of trying to balance the US and the USSR and to prevent either from becoming dominant in the region. The Middle Eastern leaders wanted to be free to pursue their own goals and objectives, and did not want to be chained to either alliance bloc. De Gaulle hoped to use this common foundation to build strong relations between the nations. He also hoped that good relations would improve France's trade with the region. De Gaulle also imagined that these allies would look up to the more powerful French nation, and would look to it in leadership in matters of foreign policy.

The end of the Algerian conflict in 1962 accomplished much in this regard. France could not portray itself as a leader of the oppressed nations of the world if it still was enforcing its colonial rule upon another nation. The battle against the Muslim separatists that France waged in favour of the minority of French settlers was an extremely unpopular one throughout the Muslim world. With the conflict raging it would have been close to impossible for France to have had positive relations with the nations of the Middle East. The Middle Eastern support for the FLN guerillas was another strain on relations that the end of the conflict removed. Most of the financial and material support for the FLN had come from the nations of the Middle East and North Africa. This was especially true of Nasser's Egypt, which had long supported the separatists. Egypt is also the most direct example of improved relations after the end of hostilities. The end of the war brought an immediate thaw to Franco-Egyptian relations, Egypt ended the trial of four French officers accused of espionage, and France ended its trade embargo against Egypt.

In 1967 de Gaulle completely overturned France's Israel policy. De Gaulle and his ministers reacted very harshly to Israel's actions in the Six-Day War. The French government and de Gaulle condemned Israel's treatment of refugees, warned that it was a mistake to occupy the West Bank and Gaza Strip, and also refused to recognize the Israeli control of Jerusalem. The French government continued to criticize Israel after the war and de Gaulle spoke out against other Israeli actions, such as the operations against the Palestine Liberation Organization in Lebanon. France began to use its veto power to oppose Israel in the UN, and France sided with the Arab states on almost all issues brought to the international body. Most importantly of all, however, de Gaulle's government imposed an arms embargo on the Israeli state. The embargo was in fact applied to all the combatants, but very soon France began selling weaponry to the Arab states again. As early as 1970 France sold Libya a hundred Dassault Mirage fighter jets. However, after 1967 France continued to support Israel's right to exist, as well as Israel's many preferential agreements with France and the European Economic Community.

Foreign aid
In the second half of the 20th century, France increased its expenditures in foreign aid greatly, to become second only to the United States in total aid amongst the Western powers and first on a per capita basis. By 1968 France was paying out $855 million per year in aid far more than either West Germany or the United Kingdom. The vast majority of French aid was directed towards Africa and the Middle East, usually either as a lever to promote French interests or to help with the sale of French products (e.g. arms sales). France also increased its expenditures on other forms of aid sending out skilled individuals to developing countries to provide technical and cultural expertise.

The combination of aid money, arms sales, and diplomatic alignments helped to erase the memory of the Suez Crisis and the Algerian War in the Arab world and France successfully developed amicable relationships with the governments of many of the Middle Eastern states. Nasser and de Gaulle, who shared many similarities, cooperated on limiting American power in the region. Nasser proclaimed France as the only friend of Egypt in the West. France and Iraq also developed a close relationship with business ties, joint military training exercises, and French assistance in Iraq's nuclear program in the 1970s. France improved relations with its former colony Syria, and eroded cultural links were partially restored.

In terms of trade France did receive some benefits from the improved relations with the Middle East. French trade with the Middle East increased by over fifty percent after de Gaulle's reforms. The weaponry industries benefited most as France soon had lucrative contracts with many of the regimes in the Middle East and North Africa, though these contracts account for a negligible part of France's economy.

De Gaulle had hoped that by taking a moderate path and not strongly supporting either side France could take part in the Middle East peace process between Israel and the Arab nations. Instead it has been excluded from any major role.

Modern history 
For France, Middle East has been the major factor of its foreign policy. Over a decade since 2000, France successfully built an influential presence across the MENA region, where the major focus had been on Saudi Arabia, the United Arab Emirates and Qatar. The Middle East policy of France was essential from the strategic, cultural and economic point of view, where the focus remained on proving itself as an international power. The country invested years in maintaining a strong foothold in the region on the lines of trade, security interests, and cultural and social exchanges. As Emmanuel Macron became the president in 2017, he gave a clear picture about the French relations with the Middle East and its importance, both in his foreign policy speeches and his initiatives. His predecessors, on the other hand, had mostly picked the option of “reassurance” with the region’s governments. Gradually, France began to show increasing interest in Saudi Arabia and the United Arab Emirates, particularly. The country became actively supportive towards the two Arab nations in their involvement in the Yemen civil war, becoming one of the crucial arms suppliers. There had been a number of calls from the human rights organizations for France to halt their arms sales to both Saudi and the UAE, which were known for causing a humanitarian crisis in Yemen. Even in 2021, Macron continued taking initiatives towards strengthening relations with the Kingdom and the Emirates. During his visit to the region in November 2021, Macron signed a weapons deal worth 16 billion euros with the UAE. The agreement involved transfer of 80 upgraded Rafale warplanes, along with 12 Airbus-built combat helicopters. While France viewed it as a way to deepen ties with the Emirates, rights organizations criticized and raised concerns around the UAE’s involvement in the Yemen and Libyan wars. They objected the deal stating that the Gulf leaders have reflected a constant failure in improving their human rights records.

Despite the improving relations between the Emirates and France, the UAE made extensive efforts towards to showcase its image in a positive light. In light of it, a Franco-Tunisian businessman, Elyes Ben Chedly reportedly ran promotion for two of the Emirates’ cultural campaigns. Reports revealed that the middleman worked to promote the UAE’s “Year of Tolerance” campaign, and was also involved in running the “year Zayed” program in Paris. Reports also revealed that Ben Chedly also used his network of arms contracts to mediate weapons deal between the UAE and other nations.

Diplomatic relations 
List of countries which France maintains diplomatic relations with:

Bilateral relations

Africa

France plays a significant role in Africa, especially in its former colonies, through extensive aid programs, commercial activities, military agreements, and cultural impact. In those former colonies where the French presence remains important, France contributes to political, military, and social stability.  Many think that French policy in Africa – particularly where British interests are also involved – is susceptible to what is known as 'Fashoda syndrome'. Others have criticized the relationship as neocolonialism under the name Françafrique, stressing France's support of various dictatorships, among others: Omar Bongo, Idriss Déby, and Denis Sassou Nguesso.

Americas

Asia

France has extensive political and economical relations with Asian countries, including China, India, Japan, South Korea and Southeast Asia as well as an increasing presence in regional fora. France was instrumental in launching the Asia–Europe Meeting (ASEM) process which could eventually emerge as a competitor to APEC. France is seeking to broaden its commercial presence in China and will pose a competitive challenge to U.S. business, particularly in aerospace, high-tech, and luxury markets. In Southeast Asia, France was an architect of the Paris Peace Accords, which ended the conflict in Cambodia.

France does not have formal diplomatic relationships with North Korea. North Korea however maintains a delegation (not an embassy nor a consulate) near Paris. As most countries, France does not recognize, nor have formal diplomatic relationships with Taiwan, due to its recognition of China; however, Taiwan maintains a representation office in Paris which is similar to an embassy. Likewise, the French Institute in Taipei has an administrative consular section that delivers visas and fulfills other missions normally dealt with by diplomatic outposts.

Europe
France has maintained its status as key power in Western Europe because of its size, location, strong economy, membership in European organizations, strong military posture and energetic diplomacy. France generally has worked to strengthen the global economic and political influence of the EU and its role in common European defense and collective security.

France supports the development of a European Security and Defence Identity (ESDI) as the foundation of efforts to enhance security in the European Union. France cooperates closely with Germany and Spain in this endeavor.

Oceania

See also

 Deployments of the French military
 Evolution of the French Empire
 French colonial empire
 French colonisation of the Americas
 Francization, use of the language
 History of France
 International relations, 1648–1814
 International relations (1814–1919)
 Causes of World War I
 French entry into World War I
 International relations (1919–1939)
 List of diplomatic missions in France
 List of diplomatic missions of France
 Visa requirements for French citizens

References

Further reading
 Aldrich, Robert, and John Connell. France and World Politics (Routledge 1989)
 Bell, P.M.H.  France and Britain, 1940–1994: The Long Separation (1997) 
 Berstein, Serge, Jean-Pierre Rioux, and Christopher Woodall. The Pompidou Years, 1969–1974 (The Cambridge History of Modern France) (2000) excerpt and text search
 Berstein, Serge, and Peter Morris. The Republic of de Gaulle 1958–1969 (The Cambridge History of Modern France) (2006)  excerpt and text search
 Bozo, Frédéric. "'Winners' and 'Losers': France, the United States, and the End of the Cold War", Diplomatic History Nov. 2009, Volume 33, Issue 5, pages 927–956, 
 Bozo, Frédéric. French Foreign Policy since 1945: An Introduction (Berghahn Books, 2016).
 Cerny, Philip G.  The Politics of Grandeur: Ideological Aspects of de Gaulle's Foreign Policy. (1980). 319 pp.
 Chassaigne, Phillipe, and Michael Dockrill, eds. Anglo-French Relations 1898–1998: From Fashoda to Jospin (2002)
 Chipman, John.  French Power in Africa (Blackwell, 1989)
 Cogan, Charles G. Oldest Allies, Guarded Friends: The United States and France since 1940 (Greenwood, 1994)
 Cole, Alistair. Franco-German Relations  (2000).
 Costigliola, Frank. France and the United States: The Cold Alliance since World War II (1992)
 Fenby, Jonathan. The General: Charles De Gaulle and the France he saved (2010).
 Feske, Victor H. "The Road To Suez: The British Foreign Office and the Quai D’Orsay, 1951–1957" in The Diplomats, 1939-1979 (2019) pp. 167–200; online
 Johnson, Douglas, et al.  Britain and France: Ten Centuries (1980) table of contents
 Keiger, J.F.V. France and the World since 1870 (2001); 261pp; topical approach emphasizing national security, intelligence & relations with major powers
 Krotz, Ulrich. "Three eras and possible futures: a long-term view on the Franco-German relationship a century after the First World War." International Affairs (2014) 20#2 pp 337–350.
  Lane, Philippe. French scientific and cultural diplomacy (2013) online
`
 Lequesne, Christian. "French foreign and security challenges after the Paris terrorist attacks." Contemporary security policy 37.2 (2016): 306–318.
 Moravcsik, Andrew et al. "De Gaulle Between Grain and Grandeur: The Political Economy of French EC Policy, 1958–1970" Journal of Cold War Studies.  (2000) 2#2 pp 3–43; 2#3 pp 4–142.; two part article plus critics plus rejoinder
 Moravcsik, Andrew. "Charles de Gaulle and Europe: The New Revisionism." Journal of Cold War Studies (2012) 14#1 pp: 53–77.
 Nuenlist, Christian, Anna Locher, and Garret Martin, eds. Globalizing de Gaulle: International Perspectives on French Foreign Policies, 1958 to 1969 (Rowman & Littlefield, 2010)
 Paxton, Robert O., ed. De Gaulle and the United States (1994)
 Soutou, Georges-Henri. "France and the Cold War, 1944-63." Diplomacy & Statecraft. (2001) 12#4 pp 3–52. 
 Sharp, Alan, and Glyn Stone, eds. Anglo-French Relations in the Twentieth Century: Rivalry and Cooperation (2000) excerpt and text search
 Simonian, Haig. The Privileged Partnership: Franco-German Relations in the European Community 1969–1984 (1985) 
 Tombs, Robert and Isabelle Tombs. That Sweet Enemy: Britain and France: The History of a Love-Hate Relationship (2008) 1688 to present online
 Williams, Philip M. and Martin Harrison. De Gaulle's Republic (1965) online

External links

 France and the UN, fact sheet on the official website of France